When Knights Were Bold (Italian:Il cavaliere del silenzio) is a 1916 Italian silent comedy film directed by Oreste Visalli. It is an adaptation of the 1906 play When Knights Were Bold by Harriett Jay.

The same year a separate British version, When Knights Were Bold, was also released.

Cast
 Signor De Mori 
 Giulio Del Torre 
 Jeanne Nolly 
 Leo Ragusi 
 Claudia Zambuto 
 Gero Zambuto

References

Bibliography
 Goble, Alan. The Complete Index to Literary Sources in Film. Walter de Gruyter, 1999.

External links

1916 films
1910s Italian-language films
Films directed by Oreste Visalli
Italian silent feature films
Italian black-and-white films
1916 comedy films
Italian comedy films
Silent comedy films